Darvish Rash (also Romanized as Darvīsh Rash; also known as Darvīsheh Rash) is a village in Karaftu Rural District, in the Central District of Takab County, West Azerbaijan Province, Iran. At the 2006 census, its population was 179, in 30 families.

References 

Populated places in Takab County